is a Japanese manga series written and illustrated by Yoshifumi Tozuka. It has been serialized in Shueisha's Weekly Shōnen Jump magazine since January 2020, with its chapters collected in 15 tankōbon volumes as of February 2023. An anime television series adaptation produced by David Production and TMS Entertainment is set to premiere in 2023.

Synopsis
Fuuko Izumo is a young girl who has been living in seclusion for 10 years since an incident that left more than 200 people dead, including her parents, when she was eight years old. Following the completion of her favorite long-running girls' manga series, Fuuko decides to commit suicide. She is tormented by the fact that she cannot be touched by anyone due to her "unluck" ability, which brings bad luck to anyone she comes into contact with in the flesh. She meets an "undead" man who has amazing regenerative abilities and who desires to die the best death possible, disliking his immortal life. For the sake of convenience, Fuuko names him Andy because he is undead, and they begin to work together.

Eventually, an assassin of the Union called Shen tells them that the organization has a special team consisting of 10 people with special abilities, and that by joining the team, they will no longer be hunted, so the two decide to join in order to attain Andy's wish for "the best death", and face numerous enemies and the mysteries of the world.

The missions of the team are proposed by a book called , which has supernatural powers. There are people with the ability to negate the rules of the world called .

Characters

Main characters

A young girl who teams up with Andy. When she was a kid, her Negator ability awakened and she accidentally killed her parents, along with other people, in a plane crash. As such, she became severely antisocial out of fear of harming others with her ability, becoming suicidal until meeting Andy. Her Negator ability, "Unluck" causes whoever touches her skin-to-skin to die after losing all of their luck.

A suicidal and reckless man who teams up with Fuuko. He is obsessed with finding a way to kill himself and takes an interest in Fuuko for her Unluck ability. His Negator ability "Undead" prevents him from dying and he can uses his regenerative abilities to do a multitude of things, such as firing his finger like a bullet. He has a card in his head that, when removed, releases a second personality called Victhor. A running gag is his clothes being destroyed, as he can not regenerate them, but this stopped when he tames the UMA Clothes. It's later revealed that Andy is one of the only people aware of the loop, as his powers means he doesn't die when the world is reset.

The Union

The leader and founder of the Union along with Victor. Her Negator ability "Unjustice" allows her to force targets to enact the opposite of their sense of "justice" by looking at them. She has tamed the UMA Move, which is the Union's main mode of transportation. After the Unbelievable arc, she reveals that the world is stuck in a time loop and she keeps her memories by using an artifact called the "Ark," and has lived for hundreds of years accompanied by Victor so that they may finally kill God.
 

A Chinese martial artist who is very perky. His former Negator ability, "Untruth" allowed him to make his targets do the opposite of what they intended to, so long as he was looking at them with at least one eye and was fond of them. He also carries a "Nyon-Kinko Staff" artifact which can extend and contract long enough to reach space. After his battle with his master resulted in his death, Mui used an artifact to revive him as a Jiangshi, losing his Negator abilities but keeping his natural martial arts skills.

Shen's subordinate. Before the Union's battle with Feng, Shen's master, she was Shen's assistant. Though she has no ability, she makes up for it by using Artifacts and Martial Arts. After Shen's death, Untruth was transferred to her.

A young Russian girl who cares for her teammates greatly. When she gained her Negator ability, her powers accidentally destroyed her village, killing her parents. She was to be sold on the black market, before being saved by Billy. She lives in a spherical robot suit, and her Negator ability "Untouchable" creates a powerful barrier around her, although she always has a hole open around her mouth to eat through.

A short-tempered Brazilian 15-year old. His Negator ability "Unstoppable" grants him super speed if he attempts to slow down once he reaches a certain speed, and his body must undergo a significant change in shape for him to stop, such as suffering a heavy injury. In the past, he was a poor boy who intended to lose a race so his friends could have a better life, however "Unstoppable" was transferred to him when he slowed down, resulting in him killing two of his friends and injuring the other by crashing into them. He joined the Union soon afterwards.

A large and muscular woman in a large suit of armor. Anything she uses her Negator ability "Unbreakable" on is granted enhanced durability, to the point of becoming indestructible.

A young boy with a body made of artifacts. His ability is "Unfeel", which negates his sense of touch.

The Union's top inventor. His Negator ability "Unforgettable" renders him incapable of forgetting any and all information since his ability manifested, no matter how minuscule. Thus, his mind is being "crushed by a never-ending stack of information." He fights using levitating, orb-shaped devices called Psycho Pods which he stores his unnecessary memories on and information on fighting styles so he can replicate them. They can also be used as lasers, transportation, and create clones of people based on Nico's memories called "Astral Dolls".

A recently awakened Negator. He is somewhat cowardly and tends to panic, but will show courage when he needs to. His ability is "Unmove," which negates the movement of anything he looks at, so long as he himself is not moving.

A former member of the Union. She was an elderly woman who used her ability "Unchange" to allow her to negate any change in inanimate objects, which she used to make herself look younger by using her negator ability to freeze her makeup in place. She fell in love with Andy, but was killed by him so Fuuko could join the Union and died peacefully after Andy kissed her and said she was beautiful, even after her true age was revealed.

A former member. He has no qualms with murder, and believes that Negators who are not part of the Union are "UMA Freaks". His Negator ability, "Unavoidable" negated the ability to dodge. Andy killed him with his Parts bullets after he found out Void could not negate his regeneration.

Nico's late wife and Mico's mother. She served the Union as both a member of the Roundtable and a member of the science division, where she met Nico. Her Negator ability, "Unsleep," rendered her unable to sleep, which eventually led to her death via exhaustion.

Under

Originally a member of the union, but later revealed to be a traitor. His Negator ability was thought to be "Unbelievable," which let him shoot bullets in directions that seemingly would miss his target, but would rebound in order to hit them. His true Negator ability, "Unfair," negates the fairness of a user having only one ability, granting him the power to copy other abilities as long as the target views him as a threat. As a result, he has access to several Negator abilities.

A killer and a member of Under. His Negator ability, "Unrepair", negates the ability to heal any wounds he inflicts on people. He also has the "Blade Runner" artifact, which creates blades when he kicks. He is apparently killed by Andy, but is resurrected in a younger body through Feng's use of an artifact, and is later restored to his true age by Anno Un. He was formerly a surgeon whose ability led to the death of his lover Leila. He and Latla seek the Ark in order to return to the past and save her, putting them at odds with the Union.

Rip's closest friend. She has a Negator ability that allows her to redirect attacks that she believes will hit her, and make the opposite of whatever she believes will happen occur instead. For example, if she believes someone will die, it is guaranteed that they will not.

A Chinese martial artist who always wears a hood, later revealed to be Shen's old mentor. Obsessed with being the "strongest in all of creation", Feng took on disciples to raise, including Shen and his sister, but intended kill them so he may get stronger. Feng is responsible for the death of Shen's sister, the catalyst for Shen's quest for strength. Though an old man when he meets Shen, he restores his youth with the artifact "Life is Strange", which he also uses to resurrect Rip. His ability, "Unfade", prevents him from aging or dying from old age.

A Negator who specializes in weaponry. His Negator ability, "Undecrease," allows him to fire weapons without reloading, though he has to completely run out of ammo to activate it.

A child-like member who wears a bunny costume, hence her nickname "Bunny". Her  Negator ability, "Unback," allows her to trap objects in eggs.

A member of Under and Billy's radioman during their mercenary days. His Negator ability, "Untell", renders him unable to communicate in any way that utilizes his body. He fights with levitating speakers that also allow him to create invisible walls.

A member of Under. She was formerly Andy's teacher, and fell in love with him, although he rejected her advances. Her Negator ability "Undraw" prevents her enemies from drawing their weapons, preventing them from attacking.

Also known as "Kururu". A member of Under and a former pop star whose Negator ability "Unchaste" caused people who felt love to become her captive if she struck a pose, causing them to rush towards her.

A member of Under. His Negator ability, "Unburn", allows him to prevent objects and people from burning or combusting. His location was the prize for capturing UMA Eat.

A thug with the power of "Unseen" which turns him invisible when he closes his eyes. He was forcibly recruited by Rip, but when he tried to kill Fuuko, Andy sliced him in half with his new Deadline move.
Burn
A UMA aligned with Under. He was captured by the Union, but was later freed by Billy in order to steal the Roundtable, later killing UMA Winter on Billy's orders. As his name suggests, he is a large monstrous UMA whose body is constantly on fire.

God and Regulators
God
The main antagonist of the series. They are responsible for all the rules of the world, creating UMAs, and forcing Negator abilities onto humanity. Killing them is the main goal of The Union. They believe rules are the superior creations, and stands in opposition to Luna.

The second God responsible for the world's creation. Unlike Sun, Luna believes people are the superior creations to the rules Sun imposes, and created artifacts to help their fight. They are also personally responsible for monitoring Ark, controlling the points that allow someone to loop.

A Negator granted the title of Regulator who worships God, aspires to be the "King of Negators", and plots to wipe out the Union to ensure Earth's destruction by God's hands. His Negator ability, "Unruin", which he derives his name from, prevents his body from falling into ruin, giving him immortality like Andy. Additionally, he has tamed the UMAs Blood and Shadow. Blood allows him to manipulate his blood and hypnotize people by piercing their brains; Shadow grants him the ability to move and teleport through shadows and create shadow clones of himself.
Seal
A UMA granted the title of Regulator, sent to carry out God's bidding and who aspires to be the "King of UMAs". He has the ability to seal away anything wrapped in the scrolls covering his body and utilize their powers, whether they are a Negator or a UMA.

Other

A manga artist who wrote To You, From Me, Fuuko's favorite manga series. Akira is a Negator with the ability "Unknown", which caused his entire existence to be unnoticed. He has a G-Pen artifact that allowed him to bring his drawings to life. He used the artifact to create an alternate persona, known as "Anno Un", in order to bypass the effects of his ability. The artifact also granted him knowledge of the future, allowing him to see events that would occur surrounding the Union and Under and allowing him to leave hints in his manga series. During the battle with UMA Autumn the G-Pen was destroyed, rendering Akira imperceivable once again, though he is satisfied that he saved Fuuko's life and that his newfound friends will never forget him.

Andy's tamed UMA. He takes the form of clothes that regenerate on Andy's body.

A youth that Andy rescues and befriends during his search for Ruin. Her Negator ability, "Unhealthy", negates any and all forms of healthiness in Lucy's body, rendering her eternally frail and sickly. With most of her life spent indoors, she developed a very active imagination. With the addition of UMA Ghost, she uses this to achieve astral projection by separating her soul from her body, which she teaches to Andy.

Also known as Victor, the second personality within Andy, and co-founder of the Union along with Juiz. Unlike Andy, he is ruthless and kills without a hint of mercy. He has a better mastery of "Undead". He retains all memories of all the previous loops, as only he is capable of surviving Ragnarok, and has thus lived for billions of years. Victor is in love with Juiz, and seeks to kill her to finally end her suffering. Initially antagonistic towards Fuuko and Andy, he makes peace with them within Andy's psyche, deciding to believe in Juiz's trust in them and see where their determination leads.

Media

Manga
A one-shot chapter was published in Shueisha's shōnen manga magazine Weekly Shōnen Jump in January 2019. The manga started its serialization in the 2020 8th issue of Weekly Shōnen Jump on January 20, 2020. Shueisha has compiled its chapters into individual tankōbon volumes. The first volume was published on April 3, 2020. As of February 3, 2023, fifteen volumes have been published.

The manga is digitally serialized by Viz Media on its Shonen Jump website. In October 2020, Viz Media announced the print and digital publication of the manga and the first volume will be published on May 4, 2021.

Volume list

Chapters not yet in tankōbon format
These chapters have yet to be published in a tankōbon volume. They were originally serialized in Japanese in issues of Shueisha's magazine Weekly Shōnen Jump and its English digital version published by Viz Media and in Manga Plus by Shueisha.

Novel
It was announced that a novel titled , written by Sawako Hirabayashi, will be published on February 2023. It will feature a previously untold story about the everyday lives of those in the Union organization. The novel will also include the stories "Gina's Recollection" and "Shen's Academy Infiltration". Tozuka is overseeing the novel and is also drawing the illustrations.

Anime
In August 2022, it was announced that the series would be receiving an anime television series adaptation produced and planned by TMS Entertainment and animated by David Production. The series is directed by Yuki Yase, with character designs handled by Hideyuki Morioka, and music composed by Kenichiro Suehiro. It is set to premiere in 2023.

Reception
By September 2022, the manga had over 1.8 million copies in circulation. In 2020, it won the sixth Next Manga Award, placing first out of the 50 nominees with 31,685 votes. The manga ranked 14th on Takarajimasha's Kono Manga ga Sugoi! list of best manga of 2021 for male readers. The series ranked #6 on the "Nationwide Bookstore Employees' Recommended Comics of 2021" by the Honya Club website. Type-Moon's Kinoko Nasu recommended the series with a comment featured on the obi of the ninth volume.

References

External links
 

 

2023 anime television series debuts
Adventure anime and manga
Anime series based on manga
Comedy anime and manga
David Production
Shōnen manga
Shueisha manga
Supernatural anime and manga
Upcoming anime television series
Viz Media manga